A centibillionaire is someone with a net worth of 100 billion United States dollars ($100,000,000,000). The following is a list of everyone who has ever been a centibillionaire:

See also 
 The World's Billionaires
 List of largest losses of wealth

References 

Lists of people by wealth
Centibillionaires
Economy-related lists of superlatives